The Samara Arboretum (French Arboretum de Samara) is an arboretum and botanical garden located in the Samara historical park in La Chaussée-Tirancourt, Somme, Picardy, France. It is open daily in the warmer months; an admission fee is charged.

Samara is a regional development project that recreates ancient civilization and habitation based on local archaeology, from paleolithic to Gallo-Roman times, including reconstructions of homes and other buildings set within the area's marshes. The park includes an arboretum (100 varieties of trees), small botanical garden (500 plant varieties), ethnobotanical garden representing neolithic cultivation, and nature trail.

See also 
 List of botanical gardens in France

References 
 Samara

 James Stephen Bromwich, The Roman Remains of Northern and Eastern France, Routledge, 2003, page 73. .

Gardens in Somme (department)
Arboreta in France